Johns Branch is a stream in Pike County in the U.S. state of Missouri. It is a tributary of Sandy Creek.

Johns Branch has the name of John Brown, the original owner of the site.

See also
List of rivers of Missouri

References

Rivers of Pike County, Missouri
Rivers of Missouri